Petroc is a further education (FE) and Higher Education (HE) college in Devon, England, with a catchment area covering more than . It also has the largest A-level sixth form in North Devon. The college serves up to 11,000 students each year, on a wide range of full and part-time courses (from entry level to higher education in partnership with Plymouth University), including distance learning and work-based training.

Petroc was formerly North Devon College and East Devon College. The institutions merged on 1 August 2008. North Devon College was the nominal survivor of the merger, however that name was deemed unsuitable for the merged college due to its expanded catchment area. The merged college was renamed Petroc in 2009. The college is named after St Petroc, a saint with numerous dedications throughout Devon and the patron saint of the Devon flag.

In 2015 the college was graded ‘good’ by Ofsted.  In 2017 it was rated as Silver within the Teaching Excellence Framework.

Petroc has three campuses. The North Devon Campus is located in Barnstaple. The Brannams Campus is also located in Barnstaple, in the Roundswell area, and takes its name from Brannam Pottery, the company which formerly occupied the site. The Mid Devon Campus is in Tiverton.

References

External links

 

Buildings and structures in Barnstaple
Tiverton, Devon
Education in Exeter
Further education colleges in Devon
Educational institutions established in 2008
Educational institutions established in 2009
2008 establishments in England
2009 establishments in England